Thomas Steiner may refer to:
 Thomas Steiner (director), Austrian experimental film director, and painter
 Thomas Steiner (politician), Austrian politician